Majavatn Church is a chapel of the Church of Norway in Grane Municipality in Nordland county, Norway. It is an annex chapel for the Grane parish which is part of the Indre Helgeland prosti (deanery) in the Diocese of Sør-Hålogaland. The white, wooden chapel was built in a long church style in 1915 as the "Majavatn misjonshus", an initiative of Paul Pedersen of the Norges Samemisjon. The church seats about 80 people. On 11 June 1924, it was consecrate as a "chapel". The chapel holds about 5 scheduled worship services each year, in addition to baptisms, confirmations, weddings, and funerals.

See also
List of churches in Sør-Hålogaland

References

Grane, Nordland
Churches in Nordland
Wooden churches in Norway
20th-century Church of Norway church buildings
Churches completed in 1915
1915 establishments in Norway
Long churches in Norway